Denis Yevseyev (born 22 May 1993) is a Kazakh tennis player.

Yevseyev has a career high ATP singles ranking of No. 262 achieved on 8 August 2022. He also has a career high ATP doubles ranking of No. 247 achieved on 12 July 2021.

Career

2017 
He played at the 2017 Asian Indoor and Martial Arts Games in singles but was defeated by Farrukh Dustov in the quarterfinal. In men's doubles partnering Timur Khabibulin, he lost the final and won a silver medal.

2018: Silver medalist at the Asian Games 
Yevseyev participated at the 2018 Asian Games in Jakarta, Indonesia. In singles, he lost to the bronze medalist South Korean Lee Duck-hee in the third round. In doubles, he won the silver medal after losing in the final with his partner Alexander Bublik against the Indian duo of Rohan Bopanna and Divij Sharan.

2019

In 2019, Yevseyev was nominated for the Kazakhstan Davis Cup team but has not participated in a match.

2020: ATP doubles debut 

Yevseyev made his ATP main draw debut at the 2020 Astana Open in the doubles draw partnering Mohamed Safwat.

2022: Maiden Challenger final 
He reached his maiden Challenger final at the President's Cup in Nur Sultan, Kazakhstan. As a result he reached a new career-high ranking in the top 300 at World No. 269.

Challenger and Futures/World Tennis Tour Finals

Singles: 14 (8–6)

Doubles 25 (10–15)

Other finals

Asian Games

Doubles 1 (1 runner-up)

References

External links

1993 births
Living people
Kazakhstani male tennis players
Sportspeople from Almaty
Asian Games silver medalists for Kazakhstan
Tennis players at the 2018 Asian Games
Medalists at the 2018 Asian Games
Asian Games medalists in tennis
21st-century Kazakhstani people